Sijan may refer to:

 Lance Sijan, American pilot
 Sijan, Alborz, a village in Alborz Province, Iran
 Sijan, Golestan, a village in Golestan Province, Iran
 Sijan, the Occitan name for Sigean in France